From a Bird's Eye View is a 1970 ATV and ITC Entertainment co-produced sitcom. In the United States it aired on NBC, which had originally ordered the series as an entry in the 1969–70 TV season but pushed it back to the 1970–71 season as a mid-season replacement.

The series followed two International Airlines stewardesses, a scatterbrained Briton and a savvy American, as they flew the London-European routes.  The series ran for 16 25-minute colour episodes.

The series was not a big success in either the UK or the US, but ITC re-used the format (and the writers and crew) for the Shirley MacLaine series Shirley's World. That show also flopped, but ran for one more episode than From a Bird's Eye View.

Production notes
Sir Lew Grade wanted to make a comedy film series that would appeal on both sides of the Atlantic starring Millicent Martin. He sent six comedy sketches of Martin to producer Sheldon Leonard and he came up with the premise of From a Bird's Eye View (although two other titles were being considered, Meet Millie and Up She Goes).

Leonard cast Patte Finley from 160 girls he interviewed over a seven-month period when he responded to her personality and that at 5'3" she would not dwarf Martin's 5'1".

Martin and Finley both underwent an official training course at the B.E.A. training centre in stewardess's duties including meal presentation, bar service, address system and survival drill.

Cast and characters
Millicent Martin as Millie Grover
Patte Finley as Maggie Ralston
Peter Jones as Clive Beauchamp
Robert Cawdron as Uncle Bert Quigley
Noel Hood as Ms. Fosdyke (Mr Beauchamp's secretary)

Episode list

Filmed on location and at Pinewood Studios England.

Airdate and order is for ITV on the Network DVD.

DVD
Network released the series on DVD with an image gallery and promotional PDF file July 2008.

References

External links
 
 CTA information
 TV.com

ITV sitcoms
Television series by ITC Entertainment
Television series produced at Pinewood Studios
1970 British television series debuts
1971 British television series endings
1970s British sitcoms
NBC original programming
English-language television shows
Aviation television series